Whelen may refer to:

 Christopher Whelen (1927–1993), English composer, conductor and playwright
 Frederick Whelen (1867-1955), theatre director
 Townsend Whelen (1877–1961), American Colonel and rifleman
 .35 Whelen, rifle cartridge
 .375 Whelen, rifle cartridge
 .400 Whelen, rifle cartridge
 Whelen Engineering Company, manufactures audio and visual warning equipment, sponsors a number of NASCAR auto racing events
 Whelen Euro Series, NASCAR Whelen Euro Series
 Whelen All-American Series
 Whelen Modified, NASCAR Whelen Modified Tour
 Whelen Southern Modified Tour

Other uses
 Camp Whelen, former summer camp in New Jersey; on the property formerly known as Harvey Cedars Hotel and now Harvey Cedars Bible Conference
 Whelen Springs, Arkansas

See also
 Whelan (disambiguation)
 Whalen (disambiguation)
 Whalan (disambiguation)
 Whaling (disambiguation)
 Wheelan